The Duchess Anne (formerly Duchess of Atholl Girl's Industrial School and Duchess Anne Restaurant) is an historic building in Dunkeld, Perth and Kinross, Scotland. Standing near Dunkeld Market Cross, it is a Category B listed building dating to 1853. It is two storeys, made of ashlar stone, and its architect was R & R Dickson.

See also
 List of listed buildings in Dunkeld And Dowally, Perth and Kinross

References

Listed buildings in Dunkeld
Category B listed buildings in Perth and Kinross
1853 establishments in Scotland